Matsyendrasana (IAST: Matsyendrāsana), Matsyendra's Pose or Lord of the Fishes Pose, is a seated twisting asana in hatha yoga and modern yoga as exercise. The full form is the difficult Paripurna Matsyendrasana. A common and easier variant is Ardha Matsyendrasana. The asana has many variations, and in its half form is one of the twelve basic asanas in many systems of hatha yoga.

Etymology and origins 

The name comes from the Sanskrit words परिपूर्ण Paripurna, perfected; मत्स्येन्द् Matsyendra, one of the founders of hatha yoga, whose name in turn means "lord of the fishes"; and आसन asana, posture or seat; अर्ध ardha means half.

The asana is medieval, described in the 15th century Haṭha Yoga Pradīpikā 1.26-7, which states that it destroys many diseases, and the 17th century Gheraṇḍa Saṃhitā 2.22-23.

Yogi Ghamande chose the asana for the cover of his historic 1905 book Yogasopana Purvacatuska; he represented the pose using a halftone plate, giving for the first time a realistic impression of the body of the yogi.

Description 

One foot is placed flat on the floor outside the opposite leg, and the torso twists towards the top leg. The bottom leg may be bent with the foot outside the opposite hip or extended with toes vertically. The arms help lever the torso into the twist, and may be bound in a variety of configurations by clutching either a foot or the opposite hand.

Variations 

For Ardha Matsyendrasana I, sit with one leg bent on the ground, the foot tucked in close to the body, and cross the other leg over across the body, the knee raised and bent, and the foot on the ground by the outside of the other leg. Twist the body and grasp the raised knee. Some practitioners will be comfortable bringing the arm over to press against the raised knee, without leaning back; some may be able to clasp the hands behind the back.

Ardha Matsyendrasana II has one leg straight out on the ground, the other bent as for Padmasana; the hand on the bent leg side grasps the outside of the outstretched boot, and the other hand reaches round the back to grasp the calf of the bent leg.

Ardha Matsyendrasana III is entered from Ardha Matsyendrasana I. The bottom leg moves into Padmasana, and the arms bind by grasping both feet.

For the reclining variant, Supta Matsyendrasana, starting from a supine position, stretch the arms out at shoulder level, bend one knee and rotate it and the hips across to the opposite side.

See also 

 Bharadvajasana, a seated twist with both knees on the floor
 Jathara Parivartanasana, a reclining twist, revolving both legs together
 Marichyasana, a seated twist with one leg straight

References

Sources 

 
 
 
 

Sitting asanas
Twisting asanas
Medieval Hatha Yoga asanas
Hip-opening asanas
Asymmetric asanas